The Order-State of Burgundy, was a proposed state, which the leadership of Nazi Germany, especially the , hoped to establish in Occupied France during World War II. Its name was a historical reference to the State of the Teutonic Order.

The name Burgundy itself is derived from the Burgundians, a Germanic tribe, who settled in and founded the Kingdom of Burgundy. A wide number of different countries and regions throughout history have been referred to by that name or controlled by a Burgundy-based state.

The most outspoken proponent of recreating a German-controlled Burgundian state was  Heinrich Himmler. According to Himmler, Burgundy, which he called "an ancient economic and cultural centre", had been "reduced to nothing more than a French appendage, known only for its wine production". The plan entailed the transformation of Burgundy into a model state, which would be nominally outside of the Greater Germanic Reich but nevertheless be ruled by a Nazi government, and which would also have its own army, laws, and postal services. It was supposed to encompass Romandy, Picardy with Amiens, Champagne with Reims and Troyes, Franche-Comté with Dijon, Chalon, along with Nevers, Hainaut, Brabant, Limburg, Flanders and Luxembourg (Belgium). Some descriptions even include Upper Normandy with Rouen north of the River Seine. It was also to have a connection to both the Mediterranean Sea and the English Channel. The capital and administrative seat was tentatively proposed as Dijon (Tischau), Lyon (Lienhardstadt) or Nancy (Nanzig). Its official language was to become German but would initially also be French.

Whether those were merely the dreams of Himmler personally or, as he so claimed, enjoyed Adolf Hitler's full support is inconclusive from the historical record. Hitler's own objective towards France was to eliminate it permanently as a possible strategic threat to German security when Germany invaded the Soviet Union. The 1940 campaign in Western Europe was carried out following Germany’s attack on Poland so that Germany's western flank could be secured. With that in mind, extensive plans were made so that France could be reduced to a minor state and a permanent German vassal that would be kept firmly in the state of dependence in which it had found itself since the 1940 armistice. 

At Hitler's request, German planners outlined how, after the fall of France in 1940, Germany would outright annex a large strip of Eastern France and return to France's late medieval borders with the Holy Roman Empire. The memo, produced by the German Interior Ministry forms the basis for the northeastern line, which separated the Zone interdite of German occupied France from the rest of the areas under military control. It proposed the settlement of a million German peasants, and the French speaking population was to become re-Germanized. He considered those areas and Wallonia to be "in reality German" because of their historical German background, and should therefore be re-integrated into the German Reich.

In 1942, Hitler also mentioned that the former area of the Kingdom of Burgundy, which France "had taken from Germany in her weakest moment", would also have to be annexed to Nazi Germany after the incorporation of the forbidden zone.

There were also proposals for an independent Breton state as a German vassal. Hitler himself mentioned that intention on at least one occasion to his military leaders but ultimately seemed to have taken little interest in the project.

See also
New Order (Nazism)
German occupation of France during World War II
Greater Germanic Reich

References

Subdivisions of Nazi Germany
Proposed countries
France in World War II
History of Burgundy
Military history of Germany during World War II